Hazel Larsen Archer (April 23, 1921, Milwaukee, Wisconsin – May 18, 2001, Tucson, Arizona) was a twentieth-century American female photographer who attended and then taught at Black Mountain College. Her images and prints captured life at Black Mountain, and her art theory and teaching influenced major 20th-century artists and personalities.

Life and work

Archer was born Hazel Frieda Larsen on April 23, 1921 to Chris and Ella Larsen. She grew up with two brothers and a sister. Larsen contracted polio at age 10. She studied at home until high school, which she negotiated with braces and crutches. In the spring of 1944, while at the University of Wisconsin, she saw a notice that German artist Josef Albers was offering summer courses in design and painting at Black Mountain College in North Carolina. It was the beginning of her long association with the experimental liberal arts college. After getting her degree at Wisconsin, she returned to Black Mountain College, where she was a student, teacher and registrar for the next nine years.

Archer matriculated into Black Mountain College in the summer of 1944 and returned in 1945 to study with Josef Albers. During her years at Black Mountain College she also studied with Buckminster Fuller, Robert Motherwell, Walter Gropius, and the photographers Beaumont Newhall and Nancy Newhall. After graduation, she joined the faculty, and became the school’s first full-time teacher of photography in 1949.

The era during which Hazel Archer was at Black Mountain College is acknowledged by scholars as one of the college's peaks in terms of intellectual and artistic activity and synergistic, cross-disciplinary innovation. The college (born out of the Bauhaus tradition) was transitioning from a predominantly European sensibility to one that was distinctly American. These years at Black Mountain College were the genesis for much of American culture in the second half of the twentieth century. She taught many significant students at the college, including Robert Rauschenberg, Cy Twombly, and Stan VanDerBeek. Archer photographed life at the college and captured the everyday moments of the school's famous teachers and students.

Archer left Black Mountain College in 1953, as its longstanding financial problems began to overwhelm it, and married Charles Archer, who was a student there. They continued to live for several years in the town of Black Mountain, where she opened a studio and took mostly family portraits. In 1956, the year the college closed, she and her husband moved to Tucson, Arizona, where she operated a free-lance photography studio. In 1963, she became director of adult education of the Tucson Art Center, an organization that would become the Tucson Museum of Art. She lived in Tucson until 1975, when she moved to Santa Fe, New Mexico. Though her work had been shown at the Museum of Modern Art and the Photo League in New York, she stopped exhibiting after 1957; she focused for the rest of her life on her work as an educator.

Death and Legacy

Archer died in Tucson, Arizona, aged 80, on May 18, 2001. Her photographs are managed by the Hazel Larsen Archer Estate and Black Mountain College Museum + Arts Center.

In 2023 the Center For Creative Photography held a major exhibition of Hazel's Archer's work in conjunction with the first major retrospective of the work of her student Linda McCartney.

References

Sources

Further reading

External links
 Hazel Archer Obituary 
 New Light on Hazel Larsen Archer
 Hazel Larsen Archer Black Mountain College
 Hazel Archer Living Treasure

1921 births
2001 deaths
20th-century American women artists
20th-century American photographers
Artists from Milwaukee
Black Mountain College faculty
Black Mountain College alumni
Artists from Santa Fe, New Mexico
Artists from Tucson, Arizona
American women academics
20th-century American women photographers
Photographers from Wisconsin
Academics from Wisconsin